These are the official results of the Women's Shot Put event at the 1982 European Championships in Athens, Greece. The final was held at the Olympic Stadium "Spiros Louis" on 6 September 1982.

Medalists

Results

Final
6 September

Participation
According to an unofficial count, 11 athletes from 7 countries participated in the event.

 (2)
 (2)
 (3)
 (1)
 (1)
 (1)
 (1)

See also
 1980 Women's Olympic Shot Put (Moscow)
 1982 Shot Put Year Ranking
 1983 Women's World Championships Shot Put (Helsinki)
 1984 Women's Olympic Shot Put (Los Angeles)
 1987 Women's World Championships Shot Put (Rome)
 1988 Women's Olympic Shot Put (Seoul)

References

 Results

Shot put
Shot put at the European Athletics Championships
1982 in women's athletics